Tripartite motif-containing 50, also known as TRIM50, is a human gene. TRIM50 encodes an E3 ubiquitin ligase. The protein encoded by this gene is a member of the tripartite motif (TRIM) family, also called the 'RING-B-box-coiled-coil' (RBCC) subgroup of RING finger proteins.  The gene is located at 7q11.23, near two homologous genes, TRIM73 and TRIM74.  TRIM50 is deleted in Williams syndrome, a multisystem developmental disorder caused by the deletion of contiguous genes at 7q11.23.

References